Huntingdale may refer to:

Places
 Huntingdale, Missouri, a community in the United States
 Huntingdale, Victoria, a suburb of Melbourne, Australia
 Huntingdale railway station
 Huntingdale, Western Australia, a south eastern suburb of Perth, Australia
 Huntingdale, Westleigh, New South Wales, Australia

Facilities and structures
 Huntingdale Primary School, Oakleigh South, Melbourne, Victoria, Australia
 Huntingdale Golf Club, Oakleigh South, Melbourne, Victoria, Australia; venue for the Australian Masters golf tournament

Other uses
 Huntingdale (horse), a Thoroughbred racehorse

See also

 
 Hunting (disambiguation)
 Dale (disambiguation)